Sueras or Suera is a municipality in the comarca of Plana Baixa in the Valencian Community, Spain.

Municipalities in the Province of Castellón